The 1979-80 French Rugby Union Championship was won by Béziers beating Toulouse in the final.

The group B was won by Chambéry beating Angoulême in the final.

Formula 

For the first time, the clubs of the "Group B" didn't participate for the title, but play a proper championship.

The group A, like the group B was divided in four pools of ten clubs.

The eight better of each pool were qualified for the knockout stages.

Group A

Qualification round 

In bold the teams qualified for knock out stages, ordered second the ranking.

"Last 32" 
In bold the clubs qualified for the next round

"Last 16" 
In bold the clubs qualified for the next round

Quarter of finals 
In bold the clubs qualified for the next round

Semifinals

Final

Group B

Qualification round 

In bold the teams qualified for knock out stages, ordered second the ranking.

"Last 32"

"Last 16"

Quarter of finals

Semifinals

Final

External links
 Compte rendu finale de 1980 lnr.fr

Notes and references 

1980
France
Championship